Denzel-Ray N. Nkemdiche (born February 15, 1993) is a former American football linebacker. He attended and played for the University of Mississippi.

High school career
A native of Loganville, Georgia, Nkemdiche attended Grayson High School, where he played for the Grayson High School Rams football team. As a senior, he helped lead the team to a 10–4 record by recording 101 tackles, 18 tackles for loss, eight sacks, and three interception returns for touchdowns. He was projected to move to the secondary in college, but lacked elite speed, which is why he was only rated as a two-star recruit and not ranked among the nation's top prospects.

College career
Nkemdiche chose to attend Ole Miss over Georgia, and redshirted his first year in Oxford, Mississippi. In the 2012 season, he led the team with 82 tackles, 13 tackles for loss, four forced fumbles, and three interceptions. He was named second-team All-SEC by the Associated Press and to the SEC All-Freshman team. On October 25, 2014, Nkemdiche broke his ankle against LSU.
During the 2015 season, he was released from the football team.

Personal life
Nkemdiche was born in Atlanta, Georgia to Nigerian immigrants Beverly and Sunday Nkemdiche. His father, a cardiologist, has reportedly applied for a researcher position at University of Mississippi Medical Center in Jackson, Mississippi. Nkemdiche's mother, a politician, returned to Nigeria in 2009 and currently represents Onitsha South in the Anambra State House of Assembly. His younger brother, Robert Nkemdiche, played defensive end for the Arizona Cardinals of the National Football League.

References

External links

Ole Miss Rebels bio 

1993 births
Living people
American sportspeople of Nigerian descent
People from Loganville, Georgia
Sportspeople from the Atlanta metropolitan area
Players of American football from Georgia (U.S. state)
American football linebackers
Ole Miss Rebels football players